Kalinovka is a rural locality (a settlement) in Rossiysky Selsoviet, Shipunovsky District, Altai Krai, Russia. The population was 190 as of 2013. There are 3 streets.

Geography 
Kalinovka is located 15 km southwest of Shipunovo (the district's administrative centre) by road. Bykovo is the nearest rural locality.

References 

Rural localities in Shipunovsky District